San Pietro Caveoso, also known as "Saint Peter and Saint Paul Church" is a Catholic worship place situated in the Sassi of Matera.
 
The front is in baroque style and presents three portals. Over each portal there is a niche with statues. They show the "Madonna of the mercy", "Saint Peter" (over the left portal) and "Saint Paul" (over the right portal). The side niches are surmounted by two rectangular windows and the central one by two single-lancet windows. There is a rose window and a bell tower with a pyramidal  on it.

The central nave ceiling is adorned with pictures of "Jesus and Saint Peter" and "Saint Paul's conversion". The 18th century altar has a wooden polyptych dating back to 1540, painted by an anonymous artist from Matera. The church originally had eight chapels, but the right four were demolished to build the oratory. In the fourth left chapel there is a baptismal font from the 13th century. It is 17.2 m width and 43 m long and has a deep choir.

The church has been recently consolidated, with a project about soil consolidation and general anchorage of the macro-elements of the building, and between the building and the foundation rock.

References

Sources and external links
M. Laterza et al., "Technical and technological qualification of ancient buildings. The case of churches in ‘Sassi di Matera’", in XII International Conference on Structural Repair and Rehabilitation, 2016, pp. 26-29.
Matera website: Cathedral 
Website of the Consiglio di Basilicata: La Cattedrale di Matera 

Churches in Basilicata
13th-century Roman Catholic church buildings in Italy
Churches in the province of Matera
Buildings and structures in Matera